Christian Cuch (25 October 1943 – 17 August 2014) was a former French cyclist. He competed in the team pursuit at the 1964 Summer Olympics.

References

1943 births
2014 deaths
French male cyclists
Olympic cyclists of France
Cyclists at the 1964 Summer Olympics
French track cyclists